İslamköy is a village in the Kulp District of Diyarbakır Province in Turkey.

References

Villages in Kulp District